Mary Joe Fernández was the defending champion but lost in the third round to Nathalie Tauziat.

Steffi Graf won in the final 7–6 (7–5), 7–6 (7–5) against Conchita Martínez.

Seeds
A champion seed is indicated in bold text while text in italics indicates the round in which that seed was eliminated. The top nine seeds received a bye to the second round.

  Steffi Graf (champion)
  Conchita Martínez (final)
 n/a
  Kimiko Date (semifinals)
  Chanda Rubin (quarterfinals)
  Brenda Schultz-McCarthy (third round)
  Lindsay Davenport (semifinals)
  Mary Joe Fernández (third round)
  Amanda Coetzer (quarterfinals)
  Julie Halard-Decugis (third round)
  Amy Frazier (first round)
  Zina Garrison-Jackson (first round)
  Nathalie Tauziat (quarterfinals)
  Irina Spîrlea (third round)
  Judith Wiesner (third round)
  Lisa Raymond (second round)
  Naoko Sawamatsu (second round)

Draw

Finals

Top half

Section 1

Section 2

Bottom half

Section 3

Section 4

References
 1996 State Farm Evert Cup Draw

Singles
1996 Newsweek Champions Cup and the State Farm Evert Cup